Platynota colobota is a species of moth of the family Tortricidae. It is found on the Galapagos Islands.

References

Moths described in 1926
Platynota (moth)